Revda is a town in Sverdlovsk Oblast, Russia. Population:

Geography

The Europe-Asia border runs through Revda.

History
It was founded in 1734 and was granted town status in 1935.

Administrative and municipal status
Within the framework of the administrative divisions, it is, together with the town of Degtyarsk and ten rural localities, incorporated as the Town of Revda—an administrative unit with the status equal to that of the districts. As a municipal division, Revda and seven rural localities are incorporated as Revda Urban Okrug. The town of Degtyarsk, together with three other rural localities, is incorporated separately as Degtyarsk Urban Okrug.

Culture
A local museum houses replicas of border markers on various road and highways in the Urals

Radio Broadcasting
Radio Rossii/GTRK Ural 89.9 MHz (Pervouralsk)
Radio Record 90.5 MHz (Pervouralsk)
Radio Mayama 94 MHz
Radio Dacha 94.5 MHz
Radio Miliceyskaya volna 95.1 MHz (Pervouralsk)
Mayak 97.2 MHz (Pervouralsk)
Interra FM 97.6 MHz (Pervouralsk)
Gold FM 98.1 MHz (Pervouralsk)
Radio Pilot 100.4 MHz (Yekaterinburg)
Dzhem FM 102.5 MHz (Yekaterinburg)
Radio C 103.7 MHz (Yekaterinburg)

References

Notes

Sources

Cities and towns in Sverdlovsk Oblast
Yekaterinburgsky Uyezd
Populated places established in 1734